Roald Amundsen's South Pole Journey is a Norwegian documentary film that features Roald Amundsen's original footage from his South Pole expedition from 1910 to 1912. The film was seen for the first time in 1912 and it was used by Amundsen for his traveling lectures.

The film was added to UNESCO's Memory of the World register in 2005 and is one of the few films to be listed in it. The film has been restored by the Norwegian Film Institute and its music has been re-recorded.

References

External links 

 Clip from the film at the National Geographic website
 

Norwegian short documentary films
1912 films
Norwegian-language films
History of Antarctica
Memory of the World Register
Norwegian silent films
Norwegian black-and-white films
1912 documentary films
1910s short documentary films
History of the Ross Dependency
Silent documentary films